Watertown Air Force Station is a closed United States Air Force ADCOM General Surveillance Radar station 3.5 miles (5.6 km) south of Watertown, New York.  Prior to the Air Defense squadron inactivating on 1 November 1979, the station was reassigned to Tactical Air Command which maintained the Ground Air Transmitter Receiver until early 1984 (now a firefighter training site). A New York State jail opened at the site c. 1983.

It was a part of the 21st RCC (NORAD Regional Control Center) a SAGE network, located at Stewart AFB.

History
Lashup Radar Network site L-6 was established in June 1950 at the Pine Camp military installation (renamed Fort Drum in 1951) and operated by the 655th Aircraft Control and Warning Squadron using an RCA AN/TPS-10A Radar.  After construction adjacent to Fort Drum in June 1952, the operation moved to the Air Force Station, one of the first twenty-four Air Defense Command radar stations of the permanent network established 1950-1951 after the USAF directed construction of the sites on December 2, 1948.  Watertown AFS used AN/FPS-3 and AN/FPS-5 radars for warning and ground-controlled interception.  In 1958 this site was operating with AN/FPS-20 search radar and General Electric AN/FPS-6 Radar for height-finding.

During 1959 Watertown AFS began providing Semi Automatic Ground Environment (SAGE) data to DC-03 at Syracuse AFS, New York, and the squadron was re-designated as the 655th Radar Squadron (SAGE) on 1 February 1959.  In 1959 a 2nd AN/FPS-6 was added and in 1961, the FPS-20 was upgraded to an AN/FPS-66.  One height-finder radar was replaced by an Avco AN/FPS-26 Radar in 1963. In 1964 the AN/FPS-66 was replaced by a Westinghouse AN/FPS-27 Radar. The other AN/FPS-6 height-finder radar was retired in 1964.

In addition to the main facility, the Watertown squadron operated two unmanned AN/FPS-14 (P-49A) and AN/FPS-18 (P-49B) Gap Filler sites:
 Suttons Corner, NY   (P-49A) 
 Oswegatchie, NY      (P-49B)

Air Force units and assignments 
Units:
 655th Aircraft Control and Warning Squadron, activated 8 December 1949 at Pine Camp, NY (L-6)
 Moved to Watertown AFS, NY, 1 February 1951
 Redesignated 655th Radar Squadron (SAGE), 1 February 1959
 Redesignated 655th Radar Squadron, 1 February 1974
 Inactivated 1 November 1979

Assignments:
 540th Aircraft Control and Warning Group (32d Air Division), 18 Dec 1949
 32d Air Division, 6 February 1952
 4711th Air Defense Wing, 16 February 1953
 32d Air Division, 1 March 1956
 Syracuse Air Defense Sector, 1 September 1958
 Boston Air Defense Sector, 4 September 1963
 35th Air Division, 1 April 1966
 21st Air Division, 19 November 1969 - 31 December 1979

References
 In March 1949, Congress authorized the construction of a permanent radar network  ("ADC radar site" P-1 was at  McChord AFB from June 1, 1950, to April 1, 1960.)

External links
https://web.archive.org/web/20091023220116/http://geocities.com/MotorCity/Downs/3548/facility/watertown.html

Installations of the United States Air Force in New York (state)
1952 in military history
1952 establishments in New York (state)
1979 in military history
1979 disestablishments in New York (state)
Buildings and structures in Jefferson County, New York
Federal Aviation Administration
History of Los Angeles
Semi-Automatic Ground Environment sites